Mazandarani, or Tabari, is an Iranian language of the Northwestern branch spoken by the Mazandarani people. , there were 2 million native speakers. As a member of the Northwestern branch (the northern branch of Western Iranian), etymologically speaking, it is rather closely related to Gilaki and also related to Persian, which belongs to the Southwestern branch. Though the Persian language has influenced Mazandarani to a great extent, Mazandarani still survives as an independent language with a northwestern Iranian origin.

Mazandarani is closely related to Gilaki, and the two languages have similar vocabularies. The Gilaki and Mazandarani languages (but not other Iranian languages) share certain typological features with Caucasian languages (specifically the non-Indo-European South Caucasian languages), reflecting the history, ethnic identity, and close relatedness to the Caucasus region and Caucasian peoples of Mazandaranis and Gilak people.

Etymology 
The name Mazanderani (and variants of it) derives from the name of the historical region of Mazandaran (Mazerun in Mazanderani), which was part of former Kingdom of Tapuria.  People traditionally call their language Tabari, as the Tabari themselves do.

The name Tapuri / Tabari (which was the name of an ancient language spoken somewhere in former Tapuria) is now used in preference to the name Mazandarani by the young.

However, both Gilan and Mazanderan formed part of the state known as Tapuria.

The earliest references to the language of Mazandaran, called Tabari, are to be found in the works of the early Muslim geographers. Al-Muqaddasī (or Moqaisi, 10th century), for example, notes: "The languages of Komish and Gurgan are similar, they use hā,  as in hā-dih and hāk-un, and they are sweet [to the ear], related to them is the language of Tabaristan, [similar] save for its speediness."

History 
Among the living Iranian languages, Mazanderani has one of the longest written traditions, from the tenth to the fifteenth century. This status was achieved during the long reign of the independent and semi-independent rulers of Mazandaran in the centuries after the Arab invasion.

The rich literature of this language includes books such as Marzban Nameh (later translated into Persian) and the poetry of Amir Pazevari. Use of Mazanderani, however, has been in decline for some time. Its literary and administrative prominence had begun to diminish in favor of Persian by the time of the integration of Mazandaran into the national administration in the early seventeenth century.

Classification 
The Mazanderani language is closely related to Gilaki and the two languages have similar vocabularies. In 1993, according to Ethnologue, there were three million native Mazanderani speakers.

The dialects of Mazanderani are Saravi, Amoli, Baboli, Ghaemshahri, Chaloosi, Nuri, Shahsavari, Ghasrani, Shahmirzadi, Damavandi, Firoozkoohi, Astarabadi and Katouli.

The native people of Sari, shahi, babol, Amol, Nowshahr, Chalus, and Tonekabon are Mazanderani people and speak the Mazanderani language.

Grammar 

Mazanderani is an inflected and genderless language. It is SOV,  but in some tenses it may be SVO, depending on the particular dialect involved.

Typology

Morphology 
Like other modern Iranian languages there is no distinction between the dative and accusative cases, and the nominative in the sentence takes almost no indicators but may be inferred from word order (depending on dialect it may end in a/o/e). Since Mazanderani lacks articles, there is no inflection for nouns in the sentence (no modifications for nouns).
For definition, nouns take the suffix e (me dətere meaning The daughter of mine while me dəter means my daughter). The indefinite article for single nouns is a-tā with tā for determination of number (a-tā kijā meaning a girl).
There exist some remnants of old Mazanderani indicating that, in the nominative case, female nouns used to end in a, while male nouns ended in e (as in jənā meaning the woman and mərdē meaning the man). Grammatical gender is still present in certain modern languages closely related to Mazandarani such as Semnani, Sangesari and Zazaki.

Usage

Function cases

Adjectives

Notable postpositions 
Adpositions in Mazanderani are after words, while most of other languages including English and Persian have preposition systems in general. the only common postpositions that sometimes becoming preposition are Še and tā. Frequently used postpositions are:

Suffixes 
The list below is a sample list obtained from the Online Mazanderani-Persian dictionary.

Locatives

Subjectives

Phonology

Vowels 

// may also range to near-open [] or a more back []. Allophones of // are heard as []. // can also be heard as [] or [].

Consonants 

// appears as an allophone of // in word-final position. // may appear as a voiceless trill in word-final position []. An occasional glottal stop // or voiceless uvular fricative // or voiced plosive // may also be heard, depending on the dialect.

Orthography 
Mazanderani is commonly written in the Perso-Arabic script. However, some use the Roman alphabet, for example in SMS messages.

Vocabulary 
Spoken in a territory sheltered by the high Alborz mountains, Mazanderani preserves many ancient Indo-European words no longer in common use in modern Iranian languages such as Persian. Listed below are a few common Mazanderani words of archaic, Indo-European provenance with Vedic cognates.

Another example relates to the cow, the most important animal in the symbolism of Indo-European culture: in Mazanderani there are more than 1000 recognized words used for different types of cow. The table below lists some specimens of this rich vocabulary. In Mazandaran there are even contests held to determine those with the greatest knowledge of this bovine nomenclature.

Influences exerted by Mazanderani

Modern-day of Iran 
In Iran, there are some popular companies and products, like Rika (son) or Kija (daughter), which take their name from Mazanderani words.

In non-Iranian languages 
There are some Mazanderani loanwords in the Turkmen language.

Examples 
The following verses are in an eastern Mazandarani dialect spoken in the Caspian littoral in northern Iran. They were transcribed and translated by Maryam Borjian and Habib Borjian.

References 
In dates given below, A.P. denotes the Iranian calendar, the solar calendar (365 days per year) which is official in Iran and Afghanistan.

Further reading 
 
 __. 2006. A Mazanderani account of the Babi Incident at Shaikh Tabarsi. Iranian Studies 39(3):381–400.
 __. 2006. Textual sources for the study of Tabari language. I. Olddocuments. Guyesh-shenâsi 4.
 __. 2008. Tabarica II: Some Mazanderani Verbs. Iran and the Caucasus 12(1):73–82.
 __. Two Mazanderani Texts from the Nineteenth Century. Studia Iranica 37(1):7–50.
 
 
 Le Coq, P. 1989. Les dialects Caspiens et les dialects du nord-ouest de l'Iran. In Rüdiger Schmitt (ed.), Compendium linguarum Iranicarum. Wiesbaden: L. Reichert. pp. 296–312.
 Nawata, Tetsuo. 1984. Māzandarāni. Tokyo: Institute for the Study of Languages and Cultures of Asia and Africa. Series: Asian and African Grammatical Manual; 17. 45 + iii pp.
 Shokri, Giti. 1990. Verb Structure in Sāri dialect. Farhang, 6:217–231. Tehran: Institute for Humanities and Cultural Studies.
 _. 1995/1374 A.P. Sārī Dialect. Tehran: Institute for Humanities and Cultural Studies.
 Shokri, Giti. 2006. Ramsarī Dialect. Tehran: Institute for Humanities and Cultural Studies.
 Yoshie, Satoko. 1996. Sārī Dialect. Tokyo: Institute for the Study of Languages and Cultures of Asia and Africa. Series: Iranian Studies; 10.

External links 

 Society for Iranian Linguistics. Among other services, archives PDFs of articles from linguistics journals, including those written in Persian.
 Institute for Humanities and Cultural Studies, Tehran.
 Audio recordings available for Mazanderani
 Dictionary of Mazanderani, with translations into Saravi, Baboli, and Amoli dialects

Northwestern Iranian languages
Subject–verb–object languages
Verb–subject–object languages
Languages of Iran
Mazandaran Province
Caspian languages
Mazanderani language